Step by Step is an American television sitcom that aired for seven seasons. It ran on ABC as part of its TGIF Friday night lineup from September 20, 1991, to August 15, 1997, then moved to CBS, where it aired from September 19, 1997, to June 26, 1998. Patrick Duffy and Suzanne Somers star as single parents Frank and Carol, respectively; each with three children, who wed and form a blended family.

Premise
Frank Lambert, a divorced contractor, has three children: John Thomas (J.T.), Alicia (Al), and Brendan. Carol Foster, a widowed salon owner, also has three children: Dana, Karen, and Mark. Both families live in Port Washington, Wisconsin.

Frank and Carol marry while vacationing in Jamaica after a whirlwind courtship and Frank plans an identical vacation to "accidentally" run into Carol. They planned to keep their marriage a secret, but Frank accidentally reveals to J.T. that they are married during a barbecue he and Carol hold to introduce all the children, leaving them surprised and angry at first.

Each episode depicts typical situations for a new blended family. Family members' differences cause arguments and resentments, but over time they grow to tolerate and become loyal to one another.

Cast and characters

Foster family
 Suzanne Somers as Carol Foster-Lambert (née Williams), the matriarch of the Foster family, who works as a beautician and runs a hair salon out of a room in her house (which is located next to the kitchen), originally with the cooperation of her mother, Ivy, and sister, Penny. Eventually, with Frank's help, she opens a bigger studio at a stand-alone location in the sixth season.
 Staci Keanan as Dana Foster, the eldest child in the Foster family. She is depicted as a smart, wisecracking feminist. She is often seen being openly hostile to the Lamberts, particularly J.T., Frank, and Cody. She and J.T. generally do not get along.
 Angela Watson as Karen Foster, the middle child in the Foster family. She is an aspiring model and sometimes a country singer, and is portrayed as vain and not very bright, but with frequent moments of level-headedness.
 Christopher Castile as Mark Foster, the youngest child in the Foster family, until Lily is born. He is into computers and academics and has a tendency to be timid.

Lambert family
 Patrick Duffy as Frank Lambert, the patriarch of the Lambert family, who works as a contractor with his own company. He is laid back and an avid sports fan, particularly of the Green Bay Packers.
 Brandon Call as John Thomas "J.T." Lambert, the oldest child in the Lambert family. He is a slacker, into sports—like his father, he is a Packers fan—and academically challenged, which is later attributed to dyslexia. He resents his new stepfamily, particularly Dana.
 Christine Lakin as Alicia "Al" Lambert, the middle child in the Lambert family. She is a tomboyish, all-American girl, who later matures and softens. She is typically addressed by her nickname, the more masculine name "Al", and is rarely referred to as "Alicia". Several episodes during the seventh season centered on her newfound interest in acting. She is openly hostile to her stepfamily.
 Josh Byrne as Brendan Lambert (seasons 1–6), the youngest child in the Lambert family, until Lily is born. He is shy, carefree, and one of the most accepting of his new stepfamily. He appears less and less as the show progresses, especially after Lily is introduced in the season four episode "A Foster/Lambert Production". When the show moved from ABC to CBS, he was written out of the series; the producers later admitted in a TV Guide interview that despite his absence, the Lamberts would still refer to their "seven children", making him an unseen character for the final season. 
 Sasha Mitchell as Cody Lambert (seasons 1–5, guest in season 7), Frank's nephew who lives in the family's driveway in a van. Mitchell appears as a recurring cast member in the first season, then was upgraded to a regular cast member in the second season. Sporting a crew cut and a Valley teen accent, he often shows maturity and intelligence belying his dimwitted veneer. Mitchell was written out of the series after the fifth season. He returned as a guest star for one episode in the seventh season. Mitchell previously played James Beaumont, the nephew of Duffy's character Bobby Ewing in Dallas.

Others
 Patrika Darbo as Penny Baker Williams (season 1), Carol's man-hungry sister.
 Peggy Rea as Ivy Baker Williams (season 1), Carol's outspoken mother.
 Emily Mae Young as Lily Foster-Lambert (seasons 6–7; originally portrayed by Lauren Meyering and Kristina Meyering in seasons 4–5), Frank and Carol's biological child. Lily is introduced in the season four episode "A Foster/Lambert Production". Though she originally appears as a baby, her age is retconned to five years in the sixth season after she is SORASed. For her age, she is smart and is always asking questions of everyone.
 Jason Marsden as Rich Halke (seasons 5–7), J.T.'s best friend. He is depicted as being both a slacker and a seriously devoted person. He later began dating Dana (to the others' dismay) in the sixth season. He was named after Richard P. Halke, who served a member of the series' writing staff from seasons one through three, and served as a story editor during the third one. Marsden also made one appearance as "Doug" in season 3.
 Jeff Juday as Jake "Flash" Gordon (season 5, appearing in four episodes), a goofy, but well-meaning handyman hired by Frank towards the end of the fifth season. He joins the family on their trip to Walt Disney World, where he attempts to visit every attraction. According to Jeff Juday, Flash was written in as a replacement for Cody. The following season, Flash was replaced by Jean-Luc.
 Bronson Pinchot as Jean-Luc Rieupeyroux (season 6), a beautician who serves as Carol's business partner. Pinchot was brought in to take the place of Sasha Mitchell in the series, but disappeared when he took the title role in the short-lived CBS sitcom Meego (which aired alongside Step by Step when the latter moved to CBS for its seventh season in 1997).
 Alexandra Adi as Samantha Milano (seasons 6–7), J.T.'s one-time girlfriend, who is introduced at the end of the season six episode "The "L" Word". They date off and on for two seasons. She works as a mechanic in a garage.

Episodes

Production

The series was created and executive produced by William Bickley and Michael Warren, and developed and executive produced by Thomas L. Miller and Robert L. Boyett. It was produced by Bickley-Warren Productions, Miller-Boyett Productions and Lorimar Television (the latter doing so from 1991 to 1993, when Warner Bros. Television assumed production responsibilities for it and Lorimar's other television series after shared corporate parent Time Warner consolidated the two production companies). The casting of Patrick Duffy fulfilled a contractual obligation that Lorimar made to give him a new show after his previous series, Dallas (which was also produced by Lorimar), had ended its run. It was created off of the idea of combining two of the most popular television stars from the 1970s known for their good looks (Duffy and Somers) to star as parents to attract adult viewers, with current teen celebrities (Staci Keanan from My Two Dads and Going Places, Brandon Call from Baywatch and Sasha Mitchell from Dallas) to star as their children to attract children and teen viewers.

Staci Keanan and Christopher Castile had previously appeared on the Miller-Boyett-produced ABC sitcom Going Places, which debuted the season prior to Step By Step, playing characters with no familial relation (Keanan – who played Lindsay Bowen, the teenage neighbor of the show's adult characters – as a series regular, Castile as a recurring character). Keanan was the first of the two Going Places stars to be cast on Step By Step in the spring of 1991. Castile, who had played gawky child Sam Roberts on Going Places, brought the same character traits to the Mark Foster role, which was speculated to be Miller-Boyett's continued attempt to give the Family Matters character Steve Urkel a white counterpart. In a similar instance of hiring actors over from their other TV series, the producers also cast Josh Byrne as Brendan Lambert on Step By Step, after he had just finished a supporting role as Patrick Kozak on Miller-Boyett's single-season CBS sitcom The Family Man.

When the series was casting its characters, child actor Jarrett Lennon originally landed the role of Mark Foster. Lennon had been chosen by the producers after guest starring in the last original episode of the Miller-Boyett series The Hogan Family, which was produced in late 1990. After shooting the original (unaired) pilot for Step By Step, Lennon was dismissed from the role of Mark, and the producers later replaced him with Castile (who had blonde hair like on-screen mother Somers, as opposed to Lennon having brown hair). Most of Lennon's pilot scenes were reshot with Castile, but during the first season, footage of Lennon remained in the show's opening title sequence. Lennon only appeared in wide shots with the Lambert/Foster family or, in the case of Suzanne Somers' credit scene, fleetingly appearing at the bottom of camera view as the kids huddled around Somers. All traces of Lennon were edited out by the second season. In 1996, these two actors had the tables turned on each other; Castile served as the original voice of Eugene Horowitz on the Nickelodeon animated series Hey Arnold!, but after a few episodes was replaced, coincidentally, by Lennon, who voiced Eugene for the remainder of the show's first season.

Going Places creators Robert Griffard and Howard Adler would end up employed with Step By Step as co-executive producers and members of its writing staff until the show's fifth season; Adler and Griffard later wrote an additional episode of the show as freelancers in the seventh season. Patrick Duffy directed several episodes, starting with the second season. The house shown in establishing shots for scenes set at the Lambert-Foster home is located at 2011 Fletcher Avenue in South Pasadena, California, although the series was actually filmed at Warner Bros. Studios in Burbank, California.

ABC chose to delay the series' sixth season to the 1996–97 mid-season (premiering in March 1997), in order to make room on that season's fall schedule for freshman sitcoms Sabrina the Teenage Witch and Clueless, which joined established series Family Matters and Boy Meets World on the TGIF lineup; the network canceled it after six seasons in May 1997, due to declining ratings. CBS concurrently reached a deal with Miller-Boyett Productions to acquire the rights to it and Family Matters from ABC, as that network attempted to build its own Friday night lineup of family-friendly situation comedies for the fall of 1997, called the "CBS Block Party". The series' ratings, which had been declining for several seasons, continued to erode, and the show ended its run in June 1998. It ended without an official series finale, although the last episode centered on Frank and Carol considering selling the house. According to Staci Keanan and Christine Lakin, the series was supposed to end with Dana and Rich's wedding at the house, and elaborate preparations were underway for it prior to the series' abrupt end.

Theme song and title sequence
The series' theme song "Second Time Around" was written and composed by Jesse Frederick and Bennett Salvay (both wrote the themes for other sitcoms produced by Miller-Boyett Productions such as Full House, Perfect Strangers, and Family Matters), and was performed by Frederick and Teresa James. The full 1 minute, 50 second version of it was only used during the first season. It was routinely edited over the following three seasons to allow additional time for scenes: the fourth verse was removed and the chorus was truncated in the second season edit, the kid chorus accompanying Jesse Frederick during the chorus' lyrics was removed in the version used during the third season, and the edit heard during most of the fourth season and the entire fifth season (which lasted for only 65 seconds) eliminated the electric guitar/drum/symphonic instrumental at the beginning.

The theme song and title sequence were dropped entirely for the sixth season, relegating the credits for the show's main cast and principal producers to appearing over each episode's cold open (which was preceded for the final two seasons by an abbreviated opening bumper featuring the family applauding as Lily blows out the candles on her birthday cake). The theme song was brought back for the seventh season, upon the show's move from ABC to CBS, although it was edited down to include only the chorus and the closing instrumental flourish (restoring the original longer symphonic instrumental heard in the original long version, and the edits used for the second and third seasons).

The amusement park seen in the opening credits is depicted as being located along the shores of Lake Michigan in Wisconsin (no amusement park like this actually exists in Port Washington). The one used is actually Six Flags Magic Mountain in Valencia, California, located miles inland from the Pacific Ocean. The body of water depicted in the opening and closing credit sequences (the latter being seen on in season one) located next to the roller coaster – which is digitally inserted into that particular excerpt – is placed over what in actuality is the parking lot of Six Flags Magic Mountain.

Syndication
In September 1995, Warner Bros. Domestic Television Distribution began distributing the series for broadcast in off-network syndication.

ABC Family was the first to acquire cable television rights to the series, and it became one of the cable channel's longest-running off-network syndicated programs in its history. Reruns began airing on there in 2001 (on what was then known as Fox Family), airing in various timeslots during its run ranging from late afternoon to the morning hours. On March 26, 2010, ABC Family's contract expired after less than nine years.

The series returned to U.S. syndication on October 7, 2013, when the Hub Network began airing reruns; the network dropped it on October 12, 2014, after the network became Discovery Family.

In Australia, Step by Step aired on the Seven Network from 1991 to 1995 and on the Nine Network from 1996 to 2000. In 2011, Step by Step was acquired by 7TWO. In 2015, 111 Greats started airing the whole series.

In the UK, Seasons 1 and 2 of Step by Step aired sporadically on ITV weekday mornings at 10 throughout parts of the spring and summer in 1994 and 1995.<ref>Step By Step on ITV, tvrdb.com, archive TV listings.</ref>
Episodes were also shown to a lesser extent during 1996 and 1997.

On September 29, 2017, Hulu acquired the streaming rights to Step by Step along with fellow Warner Bros. TV properties Family Matters, Full House, Hangin' with Mr. Cooper and Perfect Strangers, in addition to fellow ABC programs Boy Meets World, Dinosaurs and Home Improvement.

On October 1, 2021, Step by Step began streaming on HBO Max after its streaming rights expired from Hulu.

Home media
Warner Home Video released a six-episode Television Favorites collection on DVD on June 27, 2006. Warner Archive Collection has released the entire series on DVD in Region 1. These are Manufacture-on-Demand (MOD) releases, available from Warner's online store and Amazon.com.

Reception
Reviewing the pilot episode, Jean Rosenbluth of Variety wrote that, despite being an unoriginal clone of The Brady Bunch'', it is a "modestly amusing, occasionally heartwarming show".

References

External links

 
 

1990s American sitcoms
1991 American television series debuts
1998 American television series endings
American Broadcasting Company original programming
American television series revived after cancellation
CBS original programming
English-language television shows
Television series about families
Television series by Lorimar Television
Television series by Warner Bros. Television Studios
Television shows set in Wisconsin
TGIF (TV programming block)
Television series about siblings